Von Neumann machine may refer to:

 Von Neumann architecture, a conceptual model of nearly all computer architecture
 IAS machine, a computer designed in the 1940s based on von Neumann's design
 Self-replicating machine, a class of machines that can replicate themselves
 Universal constructor (disambiguation)
 Von Neumann probes, hypothetical space probes capable of self-replication
 Nanorobots, capable of self-replication
 The Von Neumann cellular automaton